Kochan is a village in Bulgaria. Kochan may also refer to:

 Kochań, a village in Poland
 Kochan (surname)

See also